Manikarnika Ghat (Hindi: मणिकर्णिका घाट) is one of the holiest cremation grounds among the sacred riverfronts (ghats), alongside the river Ganges, in the city of Varanasi in the Indian state of Uttar Pradesh. In Hinduism, death is considered a gateway to another life marked by the result of one's karma. It is believed that a human's soul attains moksha, and hence breaks the cycle of rebirth when cremated here. Thus, scores of the elderly across the whole country seek to walk up to its edges, and spend their last days absorbing the charisma of the ghat making death painless and insignificant to be pondered upon. 

The ghat is named after Sati's earrings which fell here. The Hindu genealogy registers at Varanasi are kept here.

Location
The Manikarnika Ghat is flanked by the Dashashwamedh Ghat and the Scindia Ghat. It is situated in Varanasi, Kashi region, India.

Mythological origin

The Manikarnika Ghat is one of the oldest ghats in Varanasi. It is mentioned in a Gupta inscription of 5th century. It is revered in Hindu religion. When Mata Sati (Adi Shakti) sacrificed her life and set her body ablaze after Raja Daksh Prajapati (one of the sons of Lord Brahma) tried to humiliate Lord Shiva in a Yagya practiced by Daksh, Lord Shiva took her burning body to the Himalaya. On seeing the unending sorrow of Lord Shiva, Vishnu sent the Divine chakra to cut the body into 51 parts, which then fell to earth. These are called "Ekannya Shaktipeeth". Lord Shiva established Shakti Peeth wherever Sati's body had fallen. Mata Sati's ear ornament fell at Manikarnika Ghat.

The Manikarnika shrine as a Shakti Peeth

The Manikarnika shrine is an important place of worship for Shaktism sect of Hinduism. It is near to the Kashi Vishwanath Temple. The mythology of Daksha yaga and Sati's self immolation is the mythology behind the origin of Shakti Peethas. The etymology of the place is due to this mythology. It is believed that Sati Devi's Ear Rings has fallen here. Manikarna in Sanskrit means Ear Rings.

Shakti Peethas are shrines that are believed to be enshrined with the presence of Shakti due to the falling of body parts of the corpse of Sati Devi, when Lord Shiva carried it and wandered. There are 51 Shakti Peeth linking to the 51 letters or akshar in Sanskrit. Each temple have shrines for Shakti. The Shakti of Manikarnika is addressed as Vishalakshi & Manikarni.

Significance

Hindu mythology teaches that the ghat is especially sacred and that people cremated there receive moksha.
As the myth goes, Vishnu, after several thousand years of tapasya, trying to please Shiva, to convince him to not destroy the holy city of Kashi when he destroys the world, managed to do so.

Lord Shiva along with Parvati came to Kashi before Vishnu to grant him his wish. Vishnu dug a kund (well) on the bank of Ganges for the bath of the couple. When Lord Shiva was bathing a Mani (Jewel) from his earring fell into the kund, hence the name Manikarnika (Mani:Beads Karnam:Ear Angad: Ornament). There is another myth about the ghat : the ear jewel from lord Shiva fell down while he was dancing angrily, which fell on the earth and thus Manikarnika Ghat formed.

Manikarnika Kund

The well at the ghat is called Manikarnika Kund and was built by Lord Vishnu.

Proposal
A proposal for renovating the Manikarnika ghat has been proposed by Departments of Landscape Architecture at the University of Illinois at Urbana, Champaign (UIUC), USA, and Bhanubhen Nanavati College of Architecture for Women (BNCA), Pune, India A proposal for renovating and redevelopment the Manikarnika ghat is in progress by Eastern Infrastructure Fund of Varanasi, India.

See also
Ratneshwar Mahadev temple
Ghats in Varanasi
Dom, an ancient community that handles cremation

Manikarnika Ghat in art

References

Ghats in Varanasi